WCCR-FM is an American radio station licensed to the borough of Clarion, Pennsylvania. WCCR-FM operates at the federally assigned frequency of 92.7 MHz with an effective radiated power of 3,000 watts. This station, along with its co-located AM sister WWCH, is owned by Clarion County Broadcasting.

History
WCCR-FM debuted in 1985 under the moniker C-93, with a Top 40/CHR format.

The construction permit to build the station was issued on February 14, 1983, with the call letters WMQP first assigned on September 4, 1984. The station never used these call letters, taking its current call sign less than a month later.

Throughout the years, the station's formats fluctuated between Top 40 and classic rock, but the station programs a format of hot adult contemporary today.

WCCR-FM is the voice of Clarion University Golden Eagles Sports.

On November 7, 2022, Seven Mountains Media announced their purchase of WCCR-FM and sister station WWCH from Clarion County Broadcasting. Seven Mountains Media also owns WKFT 101.3 FM in Strattanville, serving as a Clarion-area simulcast of WIFT 102.1 FM in DuBois.

References

External links

CCR-FM
Radio stations established in 1985
1985 establishments in Pennsylvania